Paffard Keatinge-Clay (born 1926) is an English-born architect in the modernist tradition who spent most of his professional life in the United States of America, before moving to southern Spain, where he has increasingly focussed on sculpture.

Practicing architecture in San Francisco from 1960 until 1975, Paffard Keatinge-Clay left behind a legacy of architectural work in the Bay Area, some of which is realised, but for a large body only paper documentation exists. These buildings and projects are indices of a career marked in equal measure by synthesis and ambition and which is characterised by a series of apprenticeships with major architectural figures that were active between late 1940 and early 1960: Le Corbusier, Frank Lloyd Wright, and Skidmore, Owings & Merrill. He also shared an association with a host of other notable designers including: Myron Goldsmith, Mies van der Rohe, Siegfried Giedion, Richard Neutra, Charles and Ray Eames, Ernő Goldfinger, and Raphael Soriano. He has lived for many years near Mijas, in Spain, where he maintains an architect's office and has developed interests in "very pure large-scale sculpture".

Early life 
Born in 1926 in the Wiltshire village of Teffont Evias, near Salisbury, in the south of England, Keatinge-Clay grew up at Teffont, where his father was rector, in a 16th-century house without electricity or indoor plumbing.

He received his education at Wellington College and at the Architectural Association in London, dual majoring in Architecture and Structural Engineering. He graduated in 1949. He began his professional career while in school at the London office of architect Ernő Goldfinger. He married Verena, daughter of Sigfried Giedion.

Architectural career 

Keatinge-Clay worked for approximately one year in the studio of famed French architect Le Corbusier at 7 Rue de Sèvres in Paris, France in 1948. While there, his work focused primarily on the Unite d’Habitacion in Marseilles and on the plan for the town of Saint Die. Leaving Europe after having graduated, Keatinge-Clay travelled across America and apprenticed for a year at Frank Lloyd Wright’s Taliesin studios in both Madison and Scottsdale, Arizona. His time in the American west under the influence of Wright culminated in a year-long effort to make a Homestead claim on a piece of government property in the Arizona desert. Here, he built a pavilion in the desert – an elemental study of components that would later become the template for his own home – on the slopes of Mount Tamalpais in Corte Madera in Marin County.

Having left Arizona in the early 1950s, Keatinge-Clay moved to Chicago where he worked at the Chicago Offices of Skidmore, Owings & Merrill on both the Inland Steel and Harris Bank and Trust Buildings with Bruce Graham and Walter Netsch. It was in Chicago that he was in contact socially and professionally with Mies van der Rohe through his father-in-law, Siegfried Gideon, and the architect/engineer Myron Goldsmith. He later transferred to their San Francisco office where he executed the Great Western Savings and Loan Building in Gardena, California. In 1961, he left the firm and began his own office.

Keatinge-Clay's own office in San Francisco was located at 680 Beach Street in what is now the Fisherman's Wharf area. Concurrently with starting up his own practice, he was teaching and lecturing in schools around the Bay Area including the University of California at Berkeley, and San Luis Obispo.

During the 14-year period from 1961 to 1975 Keatinge-Clay produced several buildings several of which remain today. The first was the previously mentioned 1965 home for himself. This was followed by a medical office building in the San Fernando Valley in 1966 and the 1968 addition to the San Francisco Art Institute, an art academy situated in the heart of the city's elite Russian Hill neighbourhood. Finally, in what would turn out to be both the most ambitious and professionally tumultuous project of his career, he was selected to design the Student Union building at San Francisco State University. Difficulties, both technical and legal, resulted in his eventual departure from the US to Canada, followed by an exodus through North Africa sometime in the late 1970s.

During the latter portion of his time in San Francisco, Keatinge-Clay was recognised abroad when he placed as an honoured finalist in two competitions in the UK, both in 1972. In what could be seen as a return to his homeland, the first of these proposals was his design in London for an administrative office addition to Parliament at Westminster. The second was for a new art museum in Glasgow, Scotland, for which he received an honourable mention.

Built works

GWS 

The roof is supported by eight concrete piers with top and bottom pin connections.
Designed by Keatinge-Clay while he was as an employee of Skidmore, Owings and Merrill, San Francisco with design partner Chuck Bassett.

Strauss Residence 

Paffard designed this house on Digby Street in San Francisco for Anne and Sherman Strauss, who lived here from 1963 to 2007. Since then the house was extensively remodeled, like enclosing the open courtyard, adding a second unit. However, the living room and details such as the stair and some flooring are in original condition.

SFAI 

The 1969 SFAI project is an informed response to a unique and topographically challenging urban site to create a new city scape as functional as it is compelling. Here, an elongated north-south ramp (similar to LeCorbusier's 1961 Carpenter Center for the Visual Arts) is driven into and through (instead of between) the "working" art studios. Workshop space is shaped as a mass supporting a great, publicly accessible belvedere from which the entire city can be viewed in a 200-degree. This horizontal datum is then broken, horizon-like, by an architectural landscape of steps, terraces and pavilions that frame views of Alcatraz, Coit Tower, and the shifting pastoral maritime landscape of San Francisco Bay beyond. In so doing, the roof becomes the frame through which the viewer perceives both the city and its occupants. Quotations from similar Corbusian buildings of the period are everywhere such as the light cannons of LaTourette or the hand railings standard in the Atelier. On the other hand, concrete columns in the open studio spaces are monolithic cruciforms typical of Mies Van der Rohe rather than the rounded pilotis of Le Corbusier.

SFSU 

Like its predecessor, the Art Institute, the building for San Francisco State shares a preoccupation with the horizontal in the creation of an artificial datum. The result of a competition and the byproduct of Moshe Safdie, who had previously been awarded the commission, Keatinge-Clay claimed the design to be the result of countless hours of collective workshops and collaborative student input. The student workshops resulted in two trapezoidal concrete pyramids: one that aligned sectionally with an axis to Polaris, the North Star, to create a space for “quiet, introspective activities”, the other was composed of an occupiable roof terrace/theater, for “boisterous, public activities”. More than half the program is buried below ground on a prominent site at the heart of the campus facing the main quadrangle. Structural expression was designed in the form of a triangulated series of poured-in-place concrete columns, ordered on a decidedly Wrightian "triagrid" plan module that hearkens back to the Usonian house studies of the late 1940s.

TP 

The Guide to Architecture in the San Francisco Bay Area of 1975 describes it with a single line: "Little more than a concrete moon viewing platform built for the Architect himself". Subsequently, the house has undergone a significant series of renovations and additional construction that no longer hint at its minimal beginnings. A symmetrical concrete pavilion stands atop a platform-like base, on which the "body" of the house is then supported by eight poured-in-place concrete columns that extend down to the topography running continuously below the floor. Domestic "space" occupies the sandwich between the two equally disposed square concrete slabs. The perceived thinness of the planes is achieved by means of an interlocking grid of post-tensioned concrete beams set both above the roof and below the floor to ensure the provision of uniform, column free "universal space" trapped between. Vertical supports are held back from the corners, allowing the ends to be cantilevered in space. Clear spanning glass panels, fixed and movable span vertically between the slabs, sliding open to the view, the fog and the breeze while allowing movement out onto open, covered terrace areas outside the glass envelope. The house was used briefly as a set for a locally produced feature film called the Crazy Quilt in 1966, made by John Korty who, as a neighbour, watched the house being built of poured cement and was inspired to write the screenplay of a man who loses houses to fire, earthquake and termites, then builds one that cannot be destroyed. Rocker Sammy Hagar rented the house in the mid-1970s, then bought it in 1977 with an advance from his album Musical Chairs. He continues to live in it.

FHA 

A simple slab building standing free of the ground on sculptural concrete pilotis, the building shows most clearly the experience of the architect with the Unite building type. Other than its clarity of massing and simple façade articulation, there is little to suggest that it carries any particular pedigree other than the hand railings that are seen in all of the aforementioned projects. PKC office also masterplanned the entire site of additions to the Warnecke building on Geary, as well as designing the two level below grade parking structure and central garden.

NMA 

A medical office building, it is a three-story high cast-in-place concrete structure with diagonal fins similar to those on the Art Institute at the upper two floors. The first floor had vertical mullions whose side-to-side spacing varied like Le Corbusier's La Tourette.

This project was done in association with the office of Dion Neutra in Los Angeles.

Artworks

Charcoal drawings

Murals 

1990 KWR The Granite Wall

1997 Düsseldorf Offices

2000 The Ox and the Maid

2003 

2003 The Lorelei

2007 The Loves of Juergen

2008 Color murals

2011 Symbols and Numbers

Literature 

Theatre "A Solas" 1985

Poetry "El Viaje" 1992

Art constructions 

1990 The Wind Warrior

1992 Dancing Flower

1992 Fibonacci

2000 The Whale

2003 Helix

2004 6SW Six Swans at Dancing Ox

2004 6SW Six Swans at Reinweg

2006 The Twins

2007 Double Helix

2007 P&P

2010 Four Farhen

Furniture design 

1990 KWR Stools

1992 Isami Noguchi inspirated table

1999 AT Glass Table

2006 HHT Tisch Hexagon

Prehistory works

Stonehenge 

Paffard Keatinge-Clay has studied the prehistory of technology in a revolutionary way and is preparing a document that throws a new light on what is known as Stonehenge.

Other projects 

Campus collocation planning studies in association with James Leefe, architect of the Pacific Lutheran Theological Center "Chapel of the Cross" at 2900 Marin in North Berkeley. Immaculate College and Pomona Colleges were for a time studying the idea of combining. The office was commissioned to design new dormitory buildings for this project in association with the office of Charles and Ray Eames.

Bibliography
Paffard Keatinge-Clay, Modern Architecture/Modern Masters (2006)
The Stones of Avebury (in process)
The odissey of an architect (in process)

References

External links
"What A Privilege", The Guardian (March 5, 2009)
"Stonehenge: What was it?", (June 16, 2015)
"Paffard Keatinge-Clay" professional blog, (July 4, 2007)
"CENA CON... PAFFARD KEATINGE-CLAY" Spanish National Newspaper El Pais (June 22, 2011)

1926 births
People educated at Wellington College, Berkshire
Modernist architects from England
People from Salisbury
Living people
Architecture in the San Francisco Bay Area
People from Corte Madera, California
British expatriates in the United States
20th-century English architects